Leander is a genus of shrimp belonging to the family Palaemonidae.

The genus has almost cosmopolitan distribution.

Species:

Leander distans 
Leander hammondii 
Leander indicus 
Leander kempi 
Leander manningi 
Leander paulensis 
Leander plumosus 
Leander tenuicornis 
Leander tenuicornis

References

Palaemonidae
Decapod genera